Podocarpus laetus is a species of conifer in the family Podocarpaceae, commonly known as Hall's tōtara, mountain tōtara  or thin-barked tōtara. Previously known as Podocarpus hallii and Podocarpus cunninghamii, in 2015 it was realised that the much earlier name P. laetus has priority. Its common name results from the species being named after J. W. Hall, a New Zealand pharmacist.

It is found only in New Zealand. It can be found growing in both montane and subalpine forests but less common in lowland forests.

P. laetus is distinguished from the more widely known lowland tōtara by its thinner bark, longer juvenile leaves and distribution at higher altitudes.

References

laetus
Trees of New Zealand
Least concern plants
Taxonomy articles created by Polbot